The 1962–63 Challenge Cup was the 62nd staging of rugby league's oldest knockout competition, the Challenge Cup.

The final was contested by Wakefield Trinity and Wigan at Wembley Stadium in London.

The final was played on Saturday 11 May 1963, where Wakefield Trinity beat Wigan 25–10 in front of a crowd of 84,492.

The Lance Todd Trophy was awarded to Wakefield  Harold Poynton.

First round

Second round

Quarter-finals

Semi-finals

Final

References

External links
 
Challenge Cup official website 
Challenge Cup 1962/63 results at Rugby League Project

Challenge Cup
Challenge Cup